Events in the year 2023 in Egypt.

Incumbents

Events 
Ongoing – COVID-19 pandemic in Egypt

 7 January – Two people are killed and another person is injured when a roof collapses in Alexandria.
 10 February – Two people are killed and 20 others are injured by a building collapse in Damanhour, Beheira Governorate.
 27 February – Egyptian foreign minister Sameh Shoukry visits Syria and Turkey for the first time in a decade following strained relations with both countries.
1 march - The Egyptian government agrees to restore daylight savings time after a break of 7 years
7 march -A train accident in the Egyptian city of Qalyub, killing four people and injuring 26 people

Sports 

 18 October 2022 – June 2023: 2022–23 Egyptian Premier League
 16 March – 22 March:
 2023 Men's Hockey Junior Africa Cup
 2023 Women's Hockey Junior Africa Cup

Deaths 

 3 January – Mohamed Enani, 83, writer and translator.

See also 

COVID-19 pandemic in Africa
2020s
African Union
Arab League
Terrorism in Egypt
Grand Ethiopian Renaissance Dam
African Continental Free Trade Area
Common Market for Eastern and Southern Africa

References  

 
Egypt
Egypt
2020s in Egypt
Years of the 21st century in Egypt